Miao Hua (born November 1955) is an admiral of the Chinese People's Liberation Army Navy (PLAN). He has served as director of the Political Work Department of the Central Military Commission since October 2017. Previously he served as political commissar of the PLA Navy from December 2014 to September 2017, and political commissar of the Lanzhou Military Region in 2014.

Biography
Miao Hua was born in November 1955 in Fuzhou, Fujian Province. He is of Rugao, Jiangsu ancestry.

He enlisted in the PLA in December 1969, serving as a soldier in the 274th regiment of the 92nd division of the 31st Group Army, in the Nanjing Military Region. He joined the Chinese Communist Party in September 1973. In the 1980s, he served as a political commissar in several regiments. In the 1990s, he rose to director of the Political Department of the 93rd division, and then political commissar of the 91st division. In August 1999, Miao became director of the Political Department of the 31st Group Army, and attained the rank of major general in July 2001. He was made Political Commissar of the 12th Group Army in July 2005.

Miao was appointed director of the Political Department of the Lanzhou Military Region in December 2010. In July 2012, he became deputy political commissar of the Lanzhou MR, and attained the rank of lieutenant general. In July 2014, he was promoted to political commissar of the Lanzhou MR, replacing General Li Changcai, who had retired.

Five months later, Miao was transferred from the army to the People's Liberation Army Navy, and appointed political commissar of the navy. It was a highly unusual move, as navy political commissars, including his predecessor Liu Xiaojiang, were normally promoted internally. Observers have interpreted the move as related to the fall of General Xu Caihou, the former vice chairman of the Central Military Commission. Miao spent most of his career in the Nanjing Military Region, and was based in Xiamen, Fujian Province around the same time when Xi Jinping served as deputy party secretary of Fujian. He worked for many years alongside Xi, who later became CCP general secretary, the top leader in 2012.

On 31 July 2015, Miao Hua was promoted to admiral,  the highest rank for Chinese military officers in active service, together with nine other officers.

Miao was a member of the 18th Central Commission for Discipline Inspection and is a member of the 19th Central Committee of the Chinese Communist Party.

References 

1955 births
Living people
People's Liberation Army generals from Fujian
Politicians from Fuzhou
Political commissars of the People's Liberation Army Navy
Members of the 19th Central Committee of the Chinese Communist Party
Chinese Communist Party politicians from Fujian
People's Republic of China politicians from Fujian